Thyanta perditor, known generally as the neotropical red-shouldered stink bug or red-shouldered stink bug, is a species of stink bug in the family Pentatomidae. It is found in the Caribbean Sea, Central America, North America, and South America.

References

Further reading

 

Articles created by Qbugbot
Insects described in 1794
Pentatomini